George Bamber (born 25 February 1887, date of death unknown) was a British artist and writer. His work was part of the art competition at the 1924 Summer Olympics.

References

1887 births
Year of death missing
19th-century British male writers
19th-century British writers
20th-century British male writers
20th-century British writers
Olympic competitors in art competitions
Artists from Manchester
Writers from Manchester